Ophelia Records is a record label founded by Seven Lions in 2018. The record label releases various electronic dance music, including dubstep, psytrance, drum & bass, and melodic bass.

The record label was announced on February 14, 2018, and two days later, on February 16, 2018, Ophelia Records had its first release, "Calling You Home" by Seven Lions featuring Runn. Seven Lions followed up this release with the two track EP Ocean in collaboration with Jason Ross on March 30, 2018, and "Horizon" in collaboration with Tritonal and Kill the Noise on May 18, 2018.

Ophelia Records was Dancing Astronaut's 2021 record label of the year. In an interview with Dancing Astronaut during the record label's takeover of Electric Zoo in 2019, Seven Lions said, "My vision for Ophelia was just a place for me to put out my music, [But] everything changes. Within the last two or three months, our release schedule has gotten so busy that I’m struggling with where to put my [own] music."

References

American record labels
Electronic dance music record labels
Record labels established in 2018